Narcissus latent virus (NLV) is a Macluravirus, a plant pathogenic virus of the family Potyviridae, which infects Narcissus.

Description 
Characterised by Brunt in 1976, it is found in Western Europe in Narcissus, Nerine and bulbous irises. It is often accompanied by other plant viruses, and is transmitted by aphids. It produces light and dark green mottling near the leaf tips.

Taxonomy 
This Macluravirus should not be confused with the similarly named Narcissus common latent virus which is a Carlavirus, and is sometimes incorrectly referred to by the name Narcissus latent virus.

References

Bibliography 
 
 Hanna BERNIAK, Beata KOMOROWSKA, Dariusz SOCHACKI. DETECTION OF NARCISSUS LATENT VIRUS ISOLATES  USING ONE-STEP RT-PCR ASSAY, Journal of Horticultural Research 2013, vol. 21(1): 11-14 DOI: 10.2478/johr-2013-0002

Viral plant pathogens and diseases
Potyviridae